David Biton (born 23 October 1982) is an Israeli footballer who plays as a striker for Beitar Ramat Gan on loan from Shikun Vatikim Ramat Gan.

External links
 

1982 births
Israeli Jews
Living people
Israeli footballers
Association football forwards
F.C. Ashdod players
Hapoel Nahlat Yehuda F.C. players
Hapoel Ra'anana A.F.C. players
Ironi Ramla F.C. players
Hapoel Azor F.C. players
Maccabi Jaffa F.C. players
F.C. Shikun HaMizrah players
Hapoel Bik'at HaYarden F.C. players
Shikun Vatikim Ramat Gan F.C. players
Hapoel Ashdod F.C. players
Beitar Ramat Gan F.C. players
Israeli Premier League players
Liga Leumit players
Footballers from Ashdod
Israeli people of Moroccan-Jewish descent